The 2005 ICC Americas Under-19 Championship was an international cricket tournament held in King City, Ontario, from 8 to 13 August 2005. It was the third edition of the ICC Americas Under-19 Championship, and the second in a row to be held in Canada.

The tournament featured five teams, the same as at the preceding 2003 edition, and the same format was used, a simple round-robin. The United States finished the tournament undefeated to win its first title, and consequently qualified for the 2006 Under-19 World Cup in Sri Lanka. The team had nearly been barred from playing, as part of proposed International Cricket Council (ICC) sanctions against the United States of America Cricket Association (USACA) for maladministration, but the situation was resolved the month before the tournament. Canada was the runner-up at the championship, with the Cayman Islands placing third, Bermuda fourth, and Argentina placing last, again finishing winless. The tournament was affected by rain, with two matches being abandoned and another shortened. A feature of the championship was its low scoring, with only four innings above 200 being recorded from the ten matches played. The tournament's leading runscorer, Canadian batsman Trevin Bastiampillai, was the only player to record more than 100 runs, while the leading wicket-taker was American bowler Abhimanyu Rajp, who took two five-wicket hauls.

Fixtures

Statistics

Most runs
The top five runscorers are included in this table, ranked by runs scored and then by batting average.

Source: CricketArchive

Most wickets

The top five wicket takers are listed in this table, ranked by wickets taken and then by bowling average.

Source: CricketArchive

References 

Under-19 regional cricket tournaments
International cricket competitions in 2005
2005 in Canadian cricket
International cricket competitions in Canada